In mathematics, a Moishezon manifold  is a compact complex manifold such that the field of meromorphic functions on each component  has transcendence degree equal the complex dimension of the component:

References
 

Algebraic geometry
Analytic geometry